Muhammad Isnaini (born 10 September 1981 in Pekanbaru) is an Indonesian footballer who plays for PSS Sleman. He is also a Police Brigadier in the Indonesian National Police.

References

External links
Profile at Tribuna

Indonesian footballers
Living people
1981 births
People from Pekanbaru
Association football forwards
PSPS Pekanbaru players
Persires Rengat players
Sportspeople from Riau